Jasmin Hasić (born 28 September 1988, Banovići) Bosnian-born boxer in super heavyweight best known for winning bronze medal at the European Junior Championships 2007 in Sombor.

At the European Junior Championships 2007, he defeated Drastamat Aslanyan from Armenia 17:16 and Darko Pirc from Croatia 24:3
but lost to Maxim Babanin from Russia by retiring in 4th round.

In 2007, the Bosnian Sports Association named him the Bosnian Junior Sportsman of the Year.

References

External links 
European Junior Championships Results - Sombor, Serbia - July 8-16 2007
AIBA - Boxing’s Time of Change – A Review of the Year 2007
Sportin.ba - Jasmin Hasić korak do medalje

1988 births
Living people
Bosnia and Herzegovina male boxers
People from Banovići
Heavyweight boxers